No. 210 Squadron was a Royal Air Force unit established in World War I. Disbanded and reformed a number of times in the ensuing years, it operated as a fighter squadron during World War I and as a maritime patrol squadron during the Spanish Civil War, World War II and the Cold War before it was last deactivated in 1971.

History

World War I
No. 210 Squadron was formed from No. 10 Squadron, Royal Naval Air Service (RNAS), when the Royal Air Force was established on 1 April 1918. No. 10 (Naval) Squadron had been raised on 12 February 1917, flying Nieuports and later Sopwith Triplanes, which were in turn replaced by Sopwith Camels in late 1917. One of its pilots was Raymond Collishaw, the RNAS's highest-scoring ace  and later an Air Vice-Marshal. The unit remained in Europe after the war, until February 1919. It then returned to the UK and was disbanded on 24 June 1919.

Between the wars
The squadron was reformed on 1 February 1920 from No. 186 Squadron, equipped with the Sopwith Cuckoo torpedo bomber. It was again disbanded on 1 April 1923.

The squadron reformed on 1 March 1931, equipped with Supermarine Southampton flying boats. The squadron initially operated out of Felixstowe before moving three months later to Pembroke Dock in Wales, June 1931. One of its pilots at this time was Don Bennett, the future commanding officer of the Pathfinder Force. In 1935 the squadron converted to the Short Rangoon and was posted to Gibraltar. A year later the squadron returned home to be re-equipped with the Short Singapore, August 1936.

In 1937 the squadron was posted to Algeria as part of an Anglo-French force charged with countering submarine attacks on neutral shipping during the Spanish Civil War. The squadron returned home in December 1937. In June 1938 the squadron converted to the Short Sunderland.

World War II

When World War II began, detachments from No. 210 Squadron were sent to Invergordon and Sullom Voe. In July 1940 the squadron moved to RAF Oban and began to re-equip with the Consolidated Catalina. The squadron returned to Pembroke Dock in October 1942, with a detachment based at Gibraltar. In April 1943, squadron headquarters moved to RAF Hamworthy. The Gibraltar detachment was transferred to No. 202 Squadron on 31 December 1943 and the remainder of the squadron at Hamworthy disbanded.

The squadron reformed the day after at Sullom Voe, when No. 190 Squadron was renumbered on 1 January 1944. During this time, Flying Officer John Cruickshank, a pilot with the squadron, was awarded the Victoria Cross for flying his aircraft home despite extensive wounds received during an attack on a German U-boat. This was one out of a total of eight German U-boats that fell victim to the Catalinas of 210 squadron. When the war ended 210 sqn flew a month postal runs to Norwegian ports but shortly thereafter officially disbanded on 4 June 1945 at Sullom Voe. The squadron's history however has a flight with the RAF Film Unit along the Norwegian coast as flown as late as on 10 June 1945.

Post war

Lancasters and Neptunes
On 1 June 1946, No. 210 Squadron reformed again when one flight ('Y') of No. 179 Squadron was renumbered. Eventually the other flight of no. 179 sqn ('X') was absorbed later in September 1946. It operated Lancaster GR.3s from RAF St Eval until September 1952, then moved to RAF Topcliffe, re-equipping with Neptune MR.1 aircraft in February 1953. The squadron disbanded at Topcliffe on 31 January 1957.

On Shackletons
The squadron reformed one more time on 1 December 1958 when No. 269 Squadron was renumbered, taking over that squadron's maritime patrol tasks from RAF Ballykelly, equipped with the Shackleton MR.2. The tasks included taking part in the UN  sanctions against Rhodesia, flown by two detachments from Sharjah in the Trucial States and Majunga, Madagascar. This lasted until 31 October 1970, when the Squadron disbanded. On 1 November 1970 the squadron's former detachment at Sharjah reformed as the new 210 sqn, but this did not last for long, as the squadron disbanded there for the last time at Sarjah on 17 November 1971.

Aircraft operated

Squadron bases

Commanding officers

References

Notes

Bibliography

 Bowyer, Michael J.F. and John D.R. Rawlings. Squadron Codes, 1937–56. Cambridge, UK: Patrick Stephens Ltd., 1979. .
 Evans, John. Sopwiths to Sunderlands: The Story of No 210 Squadron RAF, 1917–1941. Pembroke Dock, Pembrokeshire, UK: Paterchurch Publications, 1999. .
 Flintham, Vic and Andrew Thomas. Combat Codes: A full explanation and listing of British, Commonwealth and Allied air force unit codes since 1938. Shrewsbury, Shropshire, UK: Airlife Publishing Ltd., 2003. .
 Halley, James J. The Squadrons of the Royal Air Force & Commonwealth 1918–1988. Tonbridge, Kent, UK: Air Britain (Historians) Ltd., 1988. .
 Jefford, C.G. RAF Squadrons, a Comprehensive record of the Movement and Equipment of all RAF Squadrons and their Antecedents since 1912. Shrewsbury, Shropshire, UK: Airlife Publishing, 1988 (second edition 2001). .
 Moyes, Philip J.R. Bomber Squadrons of the RAF and their Aircraft. London: Macdonald and Jane's (Publishers) Ltd., 2nd edition 1976. .
 Rawlings, John D.R. Coastal, Support and Special Squadrons of the RAF and their Aircraft. London: Jane's Publishing Company Ltd., 1982. .
 Rawlings, John D.R. Fighter Squadrons of the RAF and their Aircraft. London: Macdonald & Jane's (Publishers) Ltd., 1969 (2nd edition 1976, reprinted 1978). .
 Seymour, Mike and Bill Balderson. To The Ends Of The Earth: 210 Squadron's Catalina Years, 1941–1945. Pembroke Dock, Pembrokeshire, UK: Paterchurch Publications, 1999. .
 Westrop, Mike. A History of No.10 Squadron Royal Navy Air Service in World War I. Atglen, Pennsylvania: Schiffer Publishing, 2004. .
 210 Squadron association periodical "Two ten – Two Six!". Nos. 4/7, Autumn 1991/Autumn 1993.

External links

 RAF Squadron history
 Air of Authority Squadron history

210
10 Squadron
Aircraft squadrons of the Royal Air Force in World War II
Maritime patrol aircraft units and formations
Military units and formations established in 1917
1917 establishments in the United Kingdom
Military units and formations disestablished in 1971